Fanore is a small village in County Clare, on the west coast of Ireland.  The area was officially classified as part of the West Clare Gaeltacht, an Irish-speaking community, until 1956.

Geography

Location
Lying on the road between Ballyvaughan and Doolin, Fanore has an extensive sandy beach and sand dunes (known as the "Rabbit Warren") around the mouth of the Caher River. It is also officially recognised as the longest village in Europe.

History
Remains of a Mesolithic dwelling have been found on the north bank of the river.

Nineteenth-century historical maps highlight buildings of interest in Fanore including Fanore Lodge as well as its archaeological heritage.

Economy
The village is very popular with walkers, surfers, rock climbers (being 6 km north of Ailladie - Ballyreen Point), tourists and is particularly interesting to botanists, owing to its location on the edge of the Burren – renowned for its unique flora and fauna. It has a pub, a post office/shop, and a restaurant, as well as a surfing school near the beach.

Transport
Bus Éireann route number 350 links Fanore to several locations: Ennis, Ennistymon, Cliffs of Moher, Doolin, Lisdoonvarna, Kinvara and Galway. There are a number of journeys each way daily. Onward rail and bus connections are available at Ennis and Galway.

Popular culture
Fanore has appeared many times on Irish television: in particular, the Father Ted series often featured scenes filmed in Fanore and its surrounding villages.

See also
 List of towns and villages in Ireland
 Ailladie, nearby rock-climbing sea-cliffs (also called Ballyreen Cliffs)
 Ballyryan, nearby rock-climbing crag (also called Ballyreen)

References

External links

 Fanore Tourist information
 Blue Flag Beach Description

Towns and villages in County Clare
Beaches of County Clare